Frederick William Horn (August 21, 1815 – January 15, 1893) was a German-American immigrant, lawyer, politician, and Wisconsin pioneer.  He served in many elected offices; he was the 4th, 7th, & 25th speaker of the Wisconsin State Assembly, and served a total of 14 years in the Assembly.  He also served five years in the Wisconsin State Senate—including the first three sessions after statehood—and was the first mayor of Cedarburg, Wisconsin, serving seven years in that role.  He generally identified as a Democrat, but was elected several times as an Independent.

Early life and career

Horn was born in Linum, in the Province of Brandenburg, in the Kingdom of Prussia. He was educated in Berlin, at the Gymnasium of the Gray Friar, but did not graduate, and entered the military service of Prussia.

He emigrated to the United States in 1836, first residing in New York state, then making his way west in 1837.  He made his residence in Michigan but traveled extensively through Illinois, Iowa, Missouri, and finally Wisconsin.  He arrived in Milwaukee, in the Wisconsin Territory, in 1840 and, in 1841, settled in Mequon, in what was then Washington County.  He resided here until his final move, to the neighboring community of Cedarburg, in 1847.  He practiced law in Cedarburg and served as Mayor. He was editor of the Cedarburg Weekly News.

In 1842 Horn entered his first public office when James Duane Doty, Governor of the Wisconsin Territory, appointed him Justice of the Peace for Washington County.

Political career
He served as postmaster for Mequon, while he was residing there, was Register of Deeds for the county in 1846 and 1847, and served on the Ozaukee County Board of Supervisors

In 1848, he ran for and was elected to the first session of the Wisconsin State Senate, running as an independent Democrat.  He was re-elected in November 1848 to a full two-year term in the Senate.

In 1850, he was elected to the Wisconsin State Assembly for the 1851 session, and was chosen as the Speaker of the Assembly for that session.  In 1853, Ozaukee County was created out of the eastern part of Washington County.  That same year, Horn was elected as one of the first two representatives of Ozaukee County in the Wisconsin Assembly for the 1854 session, he was again chosen as Speaker for that session.

Later in 1854 and 1855, he served as Wisconsin's Commissioner for Immigration in New York City, directing new immigrants and settlers to Wisconsin.

He served again in the 1859 and 1860 sessions of the Wisconsin Assembly.  Also during this time, he represented Wisconsin on the Democratic National Committee, and was Vice President of the 1860 Democratic National Conventions in Charleston and Baltimore.  He was also a delegate for Wisconsin at the 1868 Democratic National Convention.

He served as Ozaukee County Commissioner of Schools from 1862 to 1865, but returned to the Assembly again in 1867, 1868, and 1872.  He was elected in 1874 with both Democratic and Republican support, and was then chosen as Speaker again for the 1875 session of the Assembly.  He went on to serve another five years in the Assembly, in 1882, 1887, 1888, 1889, and 1890.

In 1890, he was elected to a four-year term in the Wisconsin State Senate, but he would die in January 1893 before the end of that term.

Horn was also active in local politics during this time, serving as Mayor of Cedarburg for the first seven years after it was incorporated as a city in 1885, and serving as Chairman of the Ozaukee County Board of Supervisors for the last four years of his life, from 1889 to 1893.

Horn is the namesake of the community of Horns Corners, Wisconsin.

Family and personal life

Horn married Adelheid Schaelher in 1845, but she died in 1849.  They had no children.  Horn married for a second time in 1850.  With his second wife, Minna Schaper, Horn had seven children.  Horn died January 15, 1893, in Cedarburg.

Electoral history

Wisconsin Assembly (1874)

| colspan="6" style="text-align:center;background-color: #e9e9e9;"| General Election, November 3, 1874

Wisconsin Assembly (1881, 1886, 1888)

| colspan="6" style="text-align:center;background-color: #e9e9e9;"| General Election, November 8, 1881

| colspan="6" style="text-align:center;background-color: #e9e9e9;"| General Election, November 2, 1886

| colspan="6" style="text-align:center;background-color: #e9e9e9;"| General Election, November 6, 1888

Wisconsin Senate (1890)

| colspan="6" style="text-align:center;background-color: #e9e9e9;"| General Election, November 4, 1890

References

|-

|-

|-

|-

|-

1815 births
1893 deaths
Politicians from Milwaukee
People from Cedarburg, Wisconsin
Prussian emigrants to the United States
Editors of Wisconsin newspapers
Wisconsin lawyers
County supervisors in Wisconsin
Mayors of places in Wisconsin
Democratic Party Wisconsin state senators
19th-century American journalists
American male journalists
19th-century American male writers
19th-century American politicians
Speakers of the Wisconsin State Assembly
Democratic Party members of the Wisconsin State Assembly
19th-century American lawyers